Phanera khasiana is a species of a "climbing shrub" or liana which grows primarily in tropical forest biomes; it is placed in the subfamily Cercidoideae and the tribe Bauhinieae, the genus having been separated from Bauhinia.  Under its synonym Bauhinia khasiana, its Vietnamese names include "móng bò" indet.  "mấu".   The native range of this species is from Arunachal Pradesh to Hainan<ref>Chen TC (1988) In: Fl.Reip.Pop.Sinicae. 39. (Leguminosae 1)</ref> and Indochina.

Accepted infraspecificsPlants of the World Online lists:
 P. khasiana var. gigalobia (D.X. Zhang) Bandyop., P.P. Ghoshal & M.K. Pathak
 P. khasiana var. khasiana (Baker) Thoth.
 P. khasiana var. tomentella'' (T.C. Chen) Bandyop., P.P. Ghoshal & M.K. Pathak

References

External links
Image at iNaturalist

Cercidoideae
Flora of Indo-China
Fabales of Asia